Antill Ponds is a rural locality in the local government area (LGA) of Southern Midlands in the Central LGA region of Tasmania. The 2016 census recorded a population of 11 for the state suburb of Antill Ponds.

History 
Antill Ponds was gazetted as a locality in 1974. The name was given by Governor Macquarie in 1811, in honour of Captain Henry Colden Antill, his Aide-de-camp.

Geography
Almost all of the boundaries are survey lines. The North-South Railway Line passes through from south to north.

Road infrastructure 
National Route 1 (Midland Highway) passes through from south to north.

References

Towns in Tasmania
Localities of Southern Midlands Council